Damon Jackson Buford (born June 12, 1970) is an American former professional baseball center fielder with the Baltimore Orioles, New York Mets, Texas Rangers, Boston Red Sox and the Chicago Cubs of Major League Baseball (MLB) between 1993 and 2001. Buford batted and threw right-handed.

Career

College career
Buford played at the University of Southern California.  His Trojan teammates included Bret Barberie, Bret Boone, Jay Hemond, and Jeff Cirillo. In 1989 and 1990, he played collegiate summer baseball with the Cotuit Kettleers of the Cape Cod Baseball League.

Notable trades
In the winter of 1992, he played in the Australian Baseball League with the Perth Heat.
On July 28, 1995, Buford was traded by the Orioles with Alex Ochoa to the Mets for a player to be named later and Bobby Bonilla. The Mets sent Jimmy Williams, a minor leaguer to complete the trade.
On January 25, 1996, he was traded by the Mets to the Rangers for Terrell Lowery.
On November 6, 1997, he was traded by the Rangers with Jim Leyritz to the Red Sox for Mark Brandenburg, Bill Haselman, and Aaron Sele.
On December 12, 1999, he was traded by the Red Sox to the Cubs for Manny Alexander.

Personal life
Born in Baltimore, Buford grew up in Los Angeles and attended Birmingham High School. His father Don Buford also played for the USC Trojans and in the MLB and later worked as hitting coordinator of the Hannibal Cavemen, under manager Jay Hemond, who played at USC while Don was hitting coach.

See also
List of second-generation Major League Baseball players

Sources

External links
, or Pelota Binaria (Venezuelan Winter League)

1970 births
Living people
African-American baseball players
American expatriate baseball players in Canada
Baltimore Orioles players
Boston Red Sox players
Cardenales de Lara players
American expatriate baseball players in Venezuela
Charlotte Knights players
Chicago Cubs players
Cotuit Kettleers players
Edmonton Trappers players
Frederick Keys players
Hagerstown Suns players
Louisville RiverBats players
Major League Baseball center fielders
New York Mets players
Pawtucket Red Sox players
Perth Heat players
Rochester Red Wings players
Texas Rangers players
USC Trojans baseball players
Wausau Timbers players
Winston-Salem Warthogs players
Baseball players from Los Angeles
Baseball players from Baltimore
Birmingham High School alumni
American expatriate baseball players in Australia
21st-century African-American sportspeople
20th-century African-American sportspeople